Samphanh is a district (muang) of Phongsaly province in northern Laos.

Settlements
A Cho Ban Nôi

References

Districts of Phongsaly province